{{DISPLAYTITLE:Pi1 Ursae Majoris}}

Pi1 Ursae Majoris (Pi1 UMa, π¹ Ursae Majoris, π¹ UMa) is a yellow G-type main sequence dwarf with a mean apparent magnitude of +5.63. It is approximately 46.8 light years from Earth, and is a relatively young star with an age of about 200 million years. It is classified as a BY Draconis type variable star and its brightness varies by 0.08 magnitudes. In 1986, it became the first solar-type star to have the emission from an X-ray flare observed. Based upon its space velocity components, this star is a member of the Ursa Major moving group of stars that share a common motion through space.

An excess of infrared radiation has been detected from this system, which suggests the presence of a debris disk. The best fit to the data indicates that there is a ring of fine debris out to a radius of about 0.4 AU, consisting of 0.25 μm grains of amorphous silicates or crystalline forsterite. There may also be a wider ring of larger (10 μm) grains out to a distance of 16 AU.

Naming and etymology
With π2, σ1,  σ2, ρ, A and d, it composed the Arabic asterism Al Ṭhibā᾽, the Gazelle. According to the catalogue of stars in the Technical Memorandum 33-507 - A Reduced Star Catalog Containing 537 Named Stars, Al Ṭhibā were the title for seven stars : A as Althiba I, this star (π1) as Althiba II, π2 as Althiba III, ρ as Althiba IV, σ1 as Althiba V, σ2 as Althiba VI, and d as Althiba VII.

References

External links
 TPF-C data for Hip 42438
 Individual results for HD 72905

Ursae Majoris, Pi
Ursae Majoris, 03
072905
G-type main-sequence stars
Ursae Majoris, 03
BY Draconis variables
Althiba II
Circumstellar disks
Ursa Major (constellation)
042438
3391
Durchmusterung objects